Charles Emerson Beecher (October 9, 1856 – February 14, 1904) was an American paleontologist most famous for the thorough excavation, preparation and study of trilobite ventral anatomy from specimens collected at Beecher's Trilobite Bed. Beecher was rapidly promoted at Yale Peabody Museum, eventually rising to head that institution.

Early life
Charles Emerson Beecher, the son of Moses and Emily Emerson Beecher, was born in Dunkirk, New York, on October 9, 1856. In early childhood Beecher's family moved to Warren, Pennsylvania, where he attended private and high schools.

A born naturalist and collector, Beecher began collecting fossils from the Chemung and Waverly Formations about Warren, resulting in an extensive collection of fossil Phyllocarids and freshwater Unionids presented to the New York State Museum in Albany in 1886 and 1887. 20,000 specimens (40,000 if duplicates are included), largely collected by Beecher himself, were present, including at least 121 species of land and fresh-water Mollusca. 102 localities are represented, seventy of which are in New York State, the others being in various parts of the United States, especially Warren, Pennsylvania and Michigan.

Beecher received an undergraduate degree (B.S.) from University of Michigan in 1878.

Academic life
Following graduation, Beecher worked for 10 years as personal assistant to the difficult, but highly influential James Hall (who also counted Fielding Meek, Charles Walcott and Josiah Whitney among his assistants) the State Geologist of New York. Working with Hall provided a strong background in systematic paleontology and allowed Beecher to further improve his fossil preparation and photography skills. Beecher is credited in many of Hall's publications for his fossil preparation, photographic and systematic contributions.

In 1888, at the request of then Curator of the Geological Collections Othniel Charles Marsh, Beecher moved to New Haven, Connecticut, to oversee the Yale Peabody Museum's growing collection of invertebrate fossils. In 1891 he was Instructor for Paleontology at Sheffield Scientific School (SSS) and took the geology course for James Dwight Dana, who was ill.

Beecher was awarded his doctorate for his study on Brachiospongidae (enigmatic Silurian sponges) in 1891. In 1892 Beecher renewed his working relationship with Charles Schuchert (who had also worked with Hall) preparing slabs of Crawfordsville crinoids for the 'Chicago Exposition'. Remarkable preparations of brachiopods, trilobites, Crawfordsville crinoids and Uintacrinus specimens for exhibition at Yale Peabody Museum were especially noteworthy and pay tribute to Beecher's exceptional skills as a fossil preparator.

Beecher was first to thoroughly excavate a thin deposit of shale that now bears his name; Beecher's Trilobite Bed. Exceptional preservation (by pyrite) of soft body parts at Beecher's Trilobite Bed is geologically rare and was later recognized as a highly significant paleontological site, a Konservat-Lagerstätten. In 1893 Beecher began the publication of his brilliant papers on the structure, development and classification of trilobites, his preparatory skill and patience worked out the structure of antennae, legs and other ventral appendages; previously impossible on any known material.

Beecher's bachelor days at New Haven (where he roomed in "the attic," the top story of the
SSS with Louis Valentine Pirsson, Samuel Lewis Penfield & Horace Lemuel Wells) came to an end on September 12, 1894, when he married Miss Mary Salome Galligan.

Beecher was a leading proponent of Neo-Lamarckism (epitomized by Edward Drinker Cope and Alpheus Hyatt) and also argued for orthogenesis and racial senescence.

Beecher's promotion path at Yale was rapid. Promoted to Professor of Historical Geology at SSS in 1897 and, on the death of Marsh in 1899, Beecher succeeded him as Curator of the Geological Collections, Yale Peabody Museum. Beecher's title at SSS was later renamed University Professor of Paleontology.

In June 1899, Beecher gave his large personal collection to the Peabody Museum. Representing 20 years of work, the 100,000+ specimens were all self collected. Mostly Devonian and Lower Carboniferous material from New York and Pennsylvania, the donated collection contained about 500 type specimens and also contained hundreds of specimens representing developmental stages, rare species, and exquisitely prepared examples showing structural detail. All specimens were meticulously labeled, named and provenanced.

At the same time as the donation, Beecher was made head of the museum following Marsh's death, and was put to mount specimens. The first one he chose was YPM VP 2182, a well-complete and articulate hadrosaur dinosaur identified then as "Claosaurus" annectans but now understood to be Edmontosaurus. The mount serves the first of many things, such as the first nearly complete dinosaur mounted in the US, and the first mounted dinosaur to have its spine horizontal to the ground, rather than be upright and tail-dragging. Beecher recognised from trackways the absence of tail marks, as well as how the ischium of the dinosaur would get in the way of the tail.

Beecher died suddenly of heart disease on February 14, 1904 leaving many of his studies unfinished. Beecher was survived by his wife, two young daughters, mother and brother. Beecher was succeeded by his close friend and colleague Charles Schuchert as Curator of the Geological Collections.

Impact

Although Beecher is most noted for his seminal work on trilobites
he is also regarded for his work on corals and was ultimately regarded as a leading authority on fossil crustacea and brachiopoda and noted for contributions in evolution.

Yale reprinted a collection of some of Beecher's most important papers, Studies in Evolution, as part of their bicentennial in 1901, although a modest Beecher deplored as extravagance the republication of papers already in print. Beecher's bibliography includes some 100+ scientific papers, often brief, describing 7 new orders, 1 new family, 2 new subfamilies, 7 new genera, and 20 new species. An apparently low content of stratigraphic and systematic paleontology publications in his body of work should be offset by his contribution to the work of Hall.

Obituaries published in some of the leading academic journals of the time attest to his professional impact: American Journal of Science; American Geologist; Science; Museum's Journal [London]; Geological Magazine [London]; and American Naturalist. A comprehensive re-examination of exceptionally preserved trilobites published in 1920 was dedicated to Beecher; his contribution was still significant nearly 20 years after his death.

Career summary
 B.S., University of Michigan, 1878
 Assistant to James Hall, New York State Museum, 1878–1888
 Assistant in Paleontology, New York State Museum
 Consulting Paleontologist, New York State Museum
 Assistant, Yale Peabody Museum, 1888–1899
 Ph.D. awarded, Yale University, 1889
 Instructor in Paleontology, Sheffield Scientific School, Yale, 1891–1892
 Assistant Professor of Paleontology, Sheffield Scientific School, Yale, 1892–1897
 Member of the governing board of the Sheffield Scientific School, Yale, 1892
 Professor of Historical Geology, Sheffield Scientific School, Yale, 1897–1902
 Corresponding member of the Boston Society of Natural History, 1898
 Curator of Geological Collections, Yale Peabody Museum, 1899–1904
 Member of the National Academy of Sciences, 1899
 Foreign correspondent of the Geological Society of London, 1899
 Fellow of the Geological Society of America, 1899
 Member of the Board of Trustees, Yale Peabody Museum, 1899
 Secretary of the Board of Trustees, Yale Peabody Museum
 Member of the Executive Committee, Yale Peabody Museum
 President of the Connecticut Academy of Arts and Sciences, 1900–1902
 University Professor of Paleontology, Sheffield Scientific School, Yale, 1902–1904

See also
 Beecher's Trilobite Bed, the trilobite Konservat-Lagerstätten that bears his name

References

External links
National Academy of Sciences Biographical Memoir

American geologists
American paleontologists
1856 births
1904 deaths
University of Michigan alumni
Yale University alumni
Yale University faculty
Fellows of the Geological Society of America
Lamarckism